SS Algol (T-AKR 287) is an  vehicle cargo ship that is currently maintained by the United States Maritime Administration as part of the Military Sealift Command's Ready Reserve Force. She was built as a high speed container ship by Rotterdamsche Droogdok Maatschappij N.V. in Rotterdam, the Netherlands, hull no. 331, for Sea-Land Service, Inc. and named SS Sea-Land Exchange, USCG ON 546383, IMO 7303205. Due to her high operating cost, Sea-Land Exchange was sold to the United States Navy in October 1981 as USNS Algol (T-AK-287).

In keeping with the pattern of the naming the Algol-class ships after bright stars, Algol was named after the bright eclipsing binary star Algol, known colloquially as the Demon Star, which is a bright star in the constellation Perseus.

Conversion
Conversion began on 13 October 1982 at National Steel and Shipbuilding in San Diego, California.  Her cargo hold was redesigned into a series of decks connected by ramps so vehicles can be driven into and out of the cargo hold for fast loading and unloading.  She was also fitted with two sets of two cranes; one set located at midship capable of lifting 35 tons, and another set located aft capable of lifting 50 tons. She was delivered to the Military Sealift Command in 1984 as USNS Algol (T-AKR 287).

Service
When not active, Algol is kept in reduced operating status due to her high operating cost. If needed, she can be activated and ready to sail in 96 hours. In 1984, Algol was the first Fast Sealift Ship to take part in a European exercise when she took part in the NATO exercise, Operation REFORGER.  Algol took part in the Persian Gulf War in 1990.  Along with the other seven Algol-class cargo ships, she transported 14 percent of all cargo delivered between the United States and Saudi Arabia during and after the war. In October 1998, Algol was activated to carry disaster relief supplies and equipment to Puerto Rico and other nearby islands following the aftermath of Hurricane Georges. In early 2003, Algol was activated to take part in Operation Iraqi Freedom.

On 1 October 2007, Algol was transferred to the United States Maritime Administration.  On 1 October 2008, Algol was transferred to the Ready Reserve Force at Ready Reserve Fleet Alameda, losing her USNS designation. If activated, SS Algol will report to the Military Sealift Command.

References

 

 

Ships built in Rotterdam
Cargo ships of the United States Navy
Algol-class vehicle cargo ships
1972 ships
Cold War auxiliary ships of the United States
Gulf War ships of the United States